Rhododendron wilhelminae is a species of plant in the family Ericaceae, endemic to Java in Indonesia. It is a critically endangered species threatened by habitat loss.

References

wilhelminae
Endemic flora of Java
Taxonomy articles created by Polbot
Critically endangered flora of Asia